HCMA Architecture + Design (often stylized as "hcma") is a Canadian architecture and design firm operating in the three Canadian centres of Vancouver, Edmonton, and Victoria. The firm's portfolio largely consists of urban planning schemes, public recreational facilities, and competitive sports facilities.

History 
Hcma Architecture + Design was founded by Rogers Hughes in 1976, under the name "Roger Hughes Architects". 

The firm's operations revolve around various services related to architectural and interior design, maintaining a focus on sustainable design. The firm also operates Tilt, an Artist-in Residence program.

Select projects 

 West Vancouver Aquatic Centre and Community Centre, Vancouver, British Columbia (2009)
 Hillcrest Centre, Vancouver, British Columbia (2011), converted from the Vancouver Olympic/Paralympic Centre
 University of British Columbia Ponderosa Commons, Vancouver, British Columbia (2013) with KPMB
 Grandview Heights Aquatic Centre, Surrey, British Columbia (2016)
 Complexe Aquatic de Laval, Laval, Quebec (2017) with NFOE
 Clayton Community Centre, Surrey, British Columbia (2021)
 Mill Woods Library, Seniors' and Multicultural Facility, Edmonton, Alberta (2015) with Dub Architects Ltd

References 

Architecture firms of Canada
Canadian companies established in 1976
Companies based in British Columbia
Design companies established in 1976